Ljupčo Arsov (19 May 1910 – 18 November 1986) was a Macedonian communist politician. He was the Prime Minister of Macedonia from December 1953 to June 1961.

Honours and awards 
Order of the People's Hero (1953).

References

External links 
Ljupčo Arsov biography on Assembly of North Macedonia website

1910 births
1986 deaths
People from Štip
People from Kosovo vilayet
League of Communists of Macedonia politicians
Yugoslav communists
Recipients of the Order of the People's Hero
Recipients of the Order of the Hero of Socialist Labour